Patrick Raymond Jean Battiston (born 12 March 1957) is a French former footballer who played as a  defender for the France national team in three World Cups and won the 1984 European Football Championship. At club level, he played for Metz, Saint-Étienne, Bordeaux, and Monaco, winning five Ligue 1 titles and one Coupe de France.

Club career
Born in Amnéville, Moselle, Battiston began his career at lower league club Talange (1966–1973), before he was spotted and purchased by FC Metz (1973–1980). After seven years at that club, he moved to Saint-Etienne (1980–1983) for three years, where they won the 1981 Division 1 title, before moving to Bordeaux (1983–1987), where they won the 1984, 1985 and 1987 league titles and two Coupe de France. Battiston then moved on to Monaco (1987–1989), where they won the 1988 league title, before he returned to Bordeaux (1989–1991).

His professional career lasted 18 seasons. Twenty-five years after his retirement, he remained in the top ten of players with the most appearances in League 1, occupying the third spot for non-goalkeepers.

International career
Battiston earned 56 caps for his national side, scoring three goals. He represented France in the 1978, 1982 and 1986 World Cups, and helped France to their victory in the 1984 European Football Championship.

1982 World Cup incident

Battiston is particularly remembered for the 1982 FIFA World Cup semi final in Seville, when France faced West Germany. He came off the bench in the second half, and after ten minutes of play, following a through ball by Platini, Battiston was clear through the German defence racing towards goal. The German goalkeeper, Harald Schumacher, raced towards Battiston as the Frenchman took the shot, missing the goal. Schumacher leapt into the air, twisting his body and colliding with Battiston. In the process Schumacher's hip hit the Frenchman's face. Battiston, clattered, fell to the ground unconscious, with damaged vertebrae and teeth knocked out, later slipping into a coma. Emergency medics had to administer oxygen on the pitch. Michel Platini later said that he thought that Battiston was dead, because "he had no pulse and looked pale".

The Dutch referee Charles Corver did not give a foul, let alone send Schumacher off. Schumacher then proceeded to take the goal-kick and play resumed. After winning the game, the goalkeeper caused more controversy when he was told that Battiston had lost two teeth, and replied: "If that's all that's wrong with him, I'll pay him the crowns."

Schumacher later apologised in person to Battiston, and the apology was accepted by Battiston.
In his autobiography, Anpfiff, published a couple of years later, Schumacher said the reason he did not go over to check on Battiston's condition was because a number of French players were standing around Battiston and making threatening gestures in his direction.

Private and later life 
Battiston's paternal grandfather was Italian from Veneto. His uncle Raymond Battiston (born 1924) played for FC Metz between 1945 and 1953. He has two sons.

After his retirement, Battiston joined the Bordeaux staff. He has held various positions, including sporting director, youth and reserve team coach and head of the youth academy. Under his leadership, the academy has produced players such as Marouane Chamakh, Rio Mavuba and Marc Planus.

Honours

Club
Saint-Étienne
Ligue 1: 1980–81

Bordeaux
Ligue 1: 1983–84, 1984–85, 1986–87
Coupe de France: 1985–86

Monaco
Ligue 1: 1987–88

International
UEFA European Football Championship: 1984
FIFA World Cup: Third-Place 1986
FIFA World Cup: Fourth-Place 1982

References

External links
 
 
 
 

1957 births
Living people
People from Amnéville
Sportspeople from Moselle (department)
French footballers
Association football defenders
France international footballers
Ligue 1 players
FC Metz players
AS Saint-Étienne players
FC Girondins de Bordeaux players
AS Monaco FC players
Olympic footballers of France
Footballers at the 1976 Summer Olympics
1978 FIFA World Cup players
1982 FIFA World Cup players
UEFA Euro 1984 players
1986 FIFA World Cup players
UEFA European Championship-winning players
French people of Italian descent
People of Venetian descent
Footballers from Grand Est